This is a summary of the highest scoring games and biggest winning margins in the Algerian Ligue Professionnelle 1 since its establishment in the 1998–1999 season.

Highest scoring

Biggest winning margin

References 

Algerian Ligue Professionnelle 1
Algerian Ligue Professionnelle 1 highest scoring games